Events from the year 1804 in Denmark.

Incumbents
 Monarch – Christian VII
 Prime minister – Christian Günther von Bernstorff

Events

 6 October  HDMS Prinds Christian Frederik is launched from Orlogsværftet on Nyholm in Copenhagen.

Births
 17 February  Christian Holm, painter (died 1846)
 28 Februar Carl van Dockum, naval officer (died 1803)
 20 March  Wilhelm Bendz, painter (died 121)
 4 March – Wilhelm Bendz, painter (died 1832)
 14 September  Niels Peter Holbech, painter (died 1889)
 7 August – Johan Nicolai Madvig, philologist and politician (died 1886)
 3 November – Constanin Hansen, painter (died 1880)

Deaths
 28 March – Frederik Christian Kaas, Admiral, landowner (born 1727)
 13 May –  David Brown, merchant and Governor of Tranquebar (born 1734)
 2 June – Cornelius Høyer, miniatures painter (born 1841)
 Marie Martine Bonfils, brewer
 5 July  Jacob Baden, philologist, pedagogue, and critic /norn 1735)
 21 October  Poul Abraham Lehn, nobleman and landowner (born 1732)
 24 December  Martin Vahl, naturalist (born 1749)

Full date missing
 Jørgen Landt, priest, botanist and author (born 1751)

References

 
1800s in Denmark
Denmark
Years of the 19th century in Denmark